Azanus, commonly called babul blues, is a genus of butterflies found in Africa and southwestern Asia.

Species
Listed alphabetically:

References

Seitz, A. Die Gross-Schmetterlinge der Erde 13: Die Afrikanischen Tagfalter. Plate XIII 73

 
Lycaenidae genera